László Gálos (3 April 1933 – 11 September 2020) was a Hungarian volleyball player. He competed in the men's tournament at the 1964 Summer Olympics.

References

External links
 

1933 births
2020 deaths
Hungarian men's volleyball players
Olympic volleyball players of Hungary
Volleyball players at the 1964 Summer Olympics
Sportspeople from Tolna County